Louise Sharon Emanuel (10 December 1953 – 7 May 2017) was a pioneering child psychotherapist who developed new methods of accessing the inner world of the under fives.

Selected publications
Understanding your three year old. 2004.
What can the matter be? Therapeutic interventions with parents, infants and young children. Karnac Books, 2008. (co-edited with Elizabeth Bradley)

References

1953 births
2017 deaths
Deaths from Creutzfeldt–Jakob disease
Neurological disease deaths in South Africa
People from Johannesburg
Psychotherapists
University of the Witwatersrand alumni